Pipunculus is a genus of flies belonging to the family Pipunculidae. The genus has a cosmopolitan distribution.

Species

Pipunculus abnormis Skevington, 1998
Pipunculus affinis Cresson, 1910
Pipunculus albidus Skevington, 1998
Pipunculus alternatus Cresson, 1910
Pipunculus amurensis Kuznetzov, 1991
Pipunculus amuricus Kuznetzov, 1991
Pipunculus annulifemur Brunetti, 1923
Pipunculus apicarinus Hardy & Knowlton, 1939
Pipunculus artus (Kertész, 1915)
Pipunculus avius Morakote, 1990
Pipunculus babai Morakote, 1990
Pipunculus basilicus Skevington, 1998
Pipunculus bulbistylus Skevington, 1998
Pipunculus calceatus Roser, 1840
Pipunculus campestris Latreille, 1805
Pipunculus carlestolrai Kuznetzov, 1993
Pipunculus chiiensis (Ôuchi, 1943)
Pipunculus cinereoaeneus Brunetti, 1912
Pipunculus cingulatus Loew, 1866
Pipunculus curvitibiae Hardy, 1939
Pipunculus dentatus Skevington, 1998
Pipunculus denticeps Kuznetzov, 1990
Pipunculus depauperatus Lamb, 1922
Pipunculus dimi Kuznetzov, 1991
Pipunculus diuteus Morakote, 1990
Pipunculus elegans Egger, 1860
Pipunculus elegantulus Williston, 1892
Pipunculus emiliae Kuznetzov, 1990
Pipunculus ferepauculus Hardy, 1965
Pipunculus flavicrus Rapp, 1946
Pipunculus fonsecai Coe, 1966
Pipunculus fuscus Loew, 1866
Pipunculus gracilis (Kertész, 1912)
Pipunculus hakuensis (Ôuchi, 1943)
Pipunculus harmstori Hardy & Knowlton, 1939
Pipunculus hastatus Skevington, 1998
Pipunculus hertzogi Rapp, 1943
Pipunculus himalayensis Brunetti, 1912
Pipunculus horvathi Kertész, 1907
Pipunculus houghi Kertész, 1900
Pipunculus infandus Kuznetzov, 1991
Pipunculus javanensis Meijere, 1907
Pipunculus kondarensis Kuznetzov, 1991
Pipunculus kotaneni Skevington, 1998
Pipunculus kozlovi Kuznetzov, 1990
Pipunculus kurilensis Kuznetzov, 1991
Pipunculus lasifemoratus Hardy & Knowlton, 1939
Pipunculus lenis Kuznetzov, 1991
Pipunculus lentigue (Kertész, 1915)
Pipunculus loewii Kertész, 1900
Pipunculus luteicornis Cresson, 1911
Pipunculus magnicarinatus Morakote, 1990
Pipunculus maritimus Skevington, 1998
Pipunculus minutulus Kuznetzov, 1991
Pipunculus mirabilis Brunetti, 1912
Pipunculus mongolicus Kuznetzov, 1990
Pipunculus monticola Schummel, 1837
Pipunculus mutillatus Loew, 1857
Pipunculus nanus Skevington, 1998
Pipunculus nigripes Loew, 1866
Pipunculus nitor Morakote, 1990
Pipunculus nodus Skevington, 1998
Pipunculus oldenbergi Collin, 1956
Pipunculus omissinervis Becker, 1889
Pipunculus oshimensis (Ôuchi, 1943)
Pipunculus pallipes Johnson, 1903
Pipunculus papulus Skevington, 1998
Pipunculus platystylus Skevington, 1998
Pipunculus pumilionis Kuznetzov, 1991
Pipunculus rafaeli Skevington, 1998
Pipunculus rarus Morakote, 1990
Pipunculus risbeci (Séguy, 1946)
Pipunculus rokotensis (Ôuchi, 1943)
Pipunculus roralis (Kertész, 1912)
Pipunculus sajanicus Kuznetzov, 1991
Pipunculus stackelbergi Kuznetzov, 1991
Pipunculus subvaripes Morakote, 1990
Pipunculus talgarensis Kuznetzov, 1991
Pipunculus tanasijtshuki Kuznetzov, 1991
Pipunculus tenuirostris Kozanek, 1981
Pipunculus tibialis (Hardy, 1943)
Pipunculus torus Skevington, 1998
Pipunculus townsendi Malloch, 1912
Pipunculus trichaetus Malloch, 1912
Pipunculus tumbarinus Malloch, 1912
Pipunculus ussuriensis Kuznetzov, 1991
Pipunculus velutinus Cresson, 1911
Pipunculus viduus Cresson, 1911
Pipunculus violovitshi Kuznetzov, 1991
Pipunculus wolfii Kowarz, 1887
Pipunculus xanthopodus (Williston, 1892)
Pipunculus zaitzevi Kuznetzov, 1990
Pipunculus zinovjevi Kuznetzov, 1991
Pipunculus zlobini Kuznetzov, 1991
Pipunculus zugmayeriae Kowarz, 1887

References

Pipunculidae
Brachycera genera
Diptera of Europe
Diptera of Asia
Diptera of North America
Taxa named by Pierre André Latreille